Below is a list of chapters of Sigma Kappa sorority.

Collegiate Chapters

Single Letter Chapters

Α
Alpha Alpha was not used as a chapter name.

Β
Neither Beta Alpha nor Beta Omicron were used as chapter names.

Γ

Δ
In 1959, Sigma Kappa and Pi Kappa Sigma merged, which created many of the Delta chapters.

Ε

Ζ

Θ

Κ
Kappa Delta, Kappa Kappa, Kappa Sigma, and Kappa Chi were not used as chapter names.

Λ

Alumnae Chapters

No alumnae chapters in Connecticut, Delaware, Rhode Island, South Carolina, or Wisconsin.
No collegiate or alumnae chapters in Alaska, Idaho, Maine, Minnesota, Mississippi, Montana, New Hampshire, New Mexico, North Dakota, South Dakota, Utah, Vermont, or Wyoming.

References

Lists of chapters of United States student societies by society
chapters